The 2014–15 season was F.C. Motagua's 68th season in existence and the club's 49th consecutive season in the top fight of Honduran football.

Overview
Despite of being eliminated early last season, the club's board of directors confirmed the continuity of coach Diego Vásquez for the start of the 2014–15 season.  On 24 April 2014, Jorge Claros, Eduardo Sosa, Víctor Ortiz and Luis Castro were separated from the club.  On 19 May 2014, Pedro Atala announced his resignation after 9 years as the club's president.  Julio Gutiérrez took charge on July.  On 8 November, Júnior Izaguirre reached 300 games playing for the club, a record at the time; he also scored the winning goal that night in the 2–1 home win over C.D. Victoria.  On 7 December, the club qualified for their first final after six tournaments being absent.  On 20 December, with a 2–1 aggregate over C.D. Real Sociedad, Motagua conquered its 13th national title by winning the 2014–15 Apertura season.

Players

Transfers in

Transfers out

Squad
 Statistics as of 24 May 2015

Results

Preseason and friendlies

Apertura

Clausura

Honduran Cup

External links
 Official website

References

F.C. Motagua seasons
Motagua
Motagua